Underwood Public School or Underwood High School (UHS) is the school district and associated school of Underwood, North Dakota, United States.

References

External links
 
 

School districts in North Dakota
Education in McLean County, North Dakota